HMS Strombolo was launched in 1795 at North Shields as the mercantile Leander. The Royal Navy purchased her in 1797, converted her to a bomb-vessel, and renamed her. She participated in the capture of Malta in 1800. The Navy laid her up in 1802 and had her broken up in 1809.

Royal Navy
Strombolo was commissioned in August 1797 under Commander John Broughton.

However, the bomb-vessel Strombolo was reported already to have participated in a bombardment of Cadiz on 5 July 1797. British casualties were light, with none of the three bomb vessels suffering any.

She was armed with sixteen 6-pounder guns and had a crew of 82 men.

Strombolo sailed for the Mediterranean in October 1799. 

Although all six vessels of the British squadron shared the prize money, only the two ships of the line and the frigate actually engaged in the battle.

Because she was part of the British squadron supporting the capture of Malta, Strombolo shared in the prize money for the capture on 30 March 1800 of Guilaume Tell.

In May Strombolo was present at the capture of Malta. 

On 25 June,  captured the French aviso Intreprenante (or Entreprenante). The next day Success captured another aviso, Redoutable, with the same armament, establishment, and mission as Intreprenante. Unfortunately for Success, she had to share the prize money with a large number of other British warships, including Strombolo.

The French frigates  (or Dianne) and  escaped from Valletta Harbour on 24 August. As part of the blockading squadron, Strombolo shared in the prize money for Diane.

Malta surrendered on 5 September. Strombolo was among the many vessels and Army units that shared the prize money.

Strombolo received a share of the prize money for the transport Venus, wrecked off Minorca and salvaged on 20 October with the aid of the frigate , 18-gun sloop Lutine, Strombolo, and the 6-gun tender . On 31 October, Pearl with Lutine, Strombolo, the 20-gun corvette , and the 12-gun polacca Transfer, took transport Fowler from Port Mahon. 

In January 1801 Commander Anthony Thompson replaced Broughton. In May Commander Edward Brown replaced Thompson.
Strombolo returned to Portsmouth on 3 June 1802 and was laid up at Deptford.

Fate
Strombolo was broken up in Deptford Dockyard July 1809.

Notes, citations, and references
Notes

Citations

References
 

1795 ships
Ships built on the River Tyne
Age of Sail merchant ships of England
Bomb vessels of the Royal Navy